Edward Dawson (16 January 1913 – 1970) was an English footballer who played as a goalkeeper.

Dawson started his career with non-league Blyth Spartans before signing for Manchester City in 1934. He joined Bristol City in 1936 without having made a first team appearance for Manchester City. He made 66 league appearances for Bristol City before the outbreak of World War II. Dawson joined Gateshead in 1946, making 83 league appearances before joining non-league North Shields in 1949.

External links

1913 births
1970 deaths
English footballers
Association football goalkeepers
Blyth Spartans A.F.C. players
Manchester City F.C. players
Bristol City F.C. players
Gateshead F.C. players
North Shields F.C. players
English Football League players